Rankinston railway station was a railway station serving the village of Rankinston, East Ayrshire, Scotland. The station was by the Glasgow and South Western Railway on the southern extension of the Ayr to Mauchline Branch.

History
The station opened on 1 January 1884, and closed on 3 April 1950.

References

Notes

Sources 
 

Disused railway stations in East Ayrshire
Railway stations in Great Britain opened in 1884
Railway stations in Great Britain closed in 1950
Former Glasgow and South Western Railway stations